Kausalya Hart is a scholar of Tamil language at UC Berkeley. She is famous for translating Sangam literature from Tamil to English and for writing many Tamil textbooks.

Life
Kausalya Hart is a scholar of Tamil. She taught in the Department of South Asian Studies at the University of California, Berkeley. She has written many books for students and has translated many works of bhakti literature from the 6th to 15th century CE.

Work
She wrote the book Tamil for Beginners, widely used in universities. She has written several Tamil plays and much other material for teaching Tamil. She has written papers on Tamil literature, including the Tamil Ramayana and aspects of early Christian literature. Her translations include many works of Tamil bhakti literature from the 6th to the 15th centuries and also the Manimekalai and the Kalingattu Parani. Her translations are available on the Project Madurai website.

See also
 List of translators into English

References

External links
South Asian Studies Council - Yale University
Tamil Expressives with Initial Voiced Stops M. B. Emeneau, Kausalya Hart - Bulletin of the School of Oriental and African Studies, University of London, Vol. 56, No. 1 (1993), pp. 75–86

1930s births
University of California, Berkeley College of Letters and Science faculty
Indian emigrants to the United States
Tamil writers
American people of Indian Tamil descent
American Hindus
Writers from Madurai
Living people
Annamalai University alumni
American women writers of Indian descent
American academics of Indian descent
Women writers from Tamil Nadu
Tamil–English translators
21st-century American women
Indian scholars